Tobias Summerer (born 1 February 1983 in Freising, Bavaria) is a German tennis player, who reached a career high on 4 July 2005, when he became the number 159 of the world.

He is currently the coach of fellow German Philipp Kohlschreiber.

References

External links
 
 

1983 births
Living people
German male tennis players
German tennis coaches
People from Freising
Sportspeople from Upper Bavaria
Tennis people from Bavaria